This is a list of newspapers in Laos.

 Pasaxon (Lao)
 Pathet Lao (Lao)
 Le Rénovateur (French)
 Vientiane Mai (Lao)
 Vientiane Times (English)
 Laotian Times (English)

See also
 Communications in Laos

Laos

Newspapers